The Mighty Ones is an American animated television series produced by DreamWorks Animation Television and created by Sunil Hall and Lynne Naylor, which premiered on November 9, 2020, on Peacock and Hulu. It was renewed for a second season, which was released on July 1, 2021.  It is the first TV series produced by DreamWorks Animation Television since their rename to be completely original material and not based on any pre-existing property. The fourth and final season premiered on December 9, 2022.

Premise
The Mighty Ones follows the eponymous quartet, consisting of a twig, a pebble, a leaf, and a strawberry. These unruly friends reside in the backyard as they try to live life to the biggest.

In the first two seasons, the backyard belonged to an all-girl rock band. In the first three episodes of the third season, the band were evicted and a young hipster couple with a baby moved in. This was negated by time travel and it went back to the original status quo.

Cast
 Josh Brener as Twig
 Jessica McKenna as Rocksy & Tim
 Jimmy Tatro as Bucky "Leaf"
 Alex Cazares as Verry Berry
 Janina Gavankar as Kensington
 Grey Griffin as Samosa & Percy the Pear
 Fryda Wolff as Bats
 Fred Tatasciore as Mr. Ladybug/Mr. Ladybüg, Rabbit, Jeff Berry, Prophetic Berry, Berry Patch, Matilda, Boppo, & Wheezy
 Eric Bauza as Ben the Stinkbug, Uncle Berry, The Beast, Additional voices
 Stephen Root as Bernard
 Kari Wahlgren as Shelly & Vera
 Tru Valentino as David "Dave" & Carder
 Steve Little as Dr. Clod
 Erika Ishii as Lindsay
 Keston John as Breht

Guest Cast
 Brett Gelman as Egg
 Greg Cipes as Josh
 Paul Rugg as Flippy
 Johnny Pemberton as Gherkin
 Keston John as Ascot Pickle
 Bennie Arthur as Tam Winkwonk
 Zeno Robinson as Norman & Shanks
 Chandni Parekh as Nugget
 Kayvan Novak as The Emperor

Episodes

Series overview

Season 1 (2020)

Season 2 (2021)

Season 3 (2022)

Season 4 (2022)

Production

Development
On January 16, 2020, it was announced that Peacock has announced that it had greenlit the series alongside Trolls: TrollsTopia and Madagascar: A Little Wild. The next day, Hulu announced that it would be the exclusive streaming service for newer DreamWorks Animation series with Sunil Hall and Lynne Naylor-Reccardi producing the series.

The show was originally pitched to Nickelodeon.

Accolades

References

External links
 

2020s American animated television series
2020 American television series debuts
2022 American television series endings
American children's animated comedy television series
American children's animated fantasy television series
Animated television series about insects
English-language television shows
Hulu original programming
Hulu children's programming
Peacock (streaming service) original programming
Peacock (streaming service) children's programming
Television series by DreamWorks Animation
Television series by Universal Television